Reg Dyer (? – ?) was an English footballer who played as a defender for Fulham. He played in 98 matches in the league for Fulham, and 103 matches in all competitions.

In late 1932 Reg played for Kent League club Ashford Town

References

English footballers
Fulham F.C. players
Ashford United F.C. players
English Football League players
Kent Football League (1894–1959) players
Association football defenders